The Head of Franz Kafka, also known as the Statue of Kafka, is an outdoor sculpture by David Černý depicting Bohemian German-language writer Franz Kafka, installed outside the Quadrio shopping centre in Prague, Czech Republic. The kinetic sculpture is 11 metres tall and made of 42 rotating panels. Each layer is mechanized and rotates individually.

References

External links

 

2014 sculptures
Busts of writers
Cultural depictions of Franz Kafka
Kinetic sculptures in the Czech Republic
Monuments and memorials in Prague
Outdoor sculptures in Prague
Sculptures of men in the Czech Republic
Works about Franz Kafka
New Town, Prague
Heads in the arts